The Apertura 2018 Liga MX championship stage commonly known as Liguilla (mini league) was played from 28 November 2018 to 16 December 2018. A total of eight teams competed in the championship stage to decide the champions of the Apertura 2018 Liga MX season. Both finalists qualified to the 2020 CONCACAF Champions League.

Qualified teams
The following 8 teams qualified for the championship stage.

In the following table, the number of appearances, last appearance, and previous best result count only those in the short tournament era starting from Invierno 1996 (not counting those in the long tournament era from 1943–44 to 1995–96).

Format
Teams were re-seeded each round.
Team with more goals on aggregate after two matches advanced.
Away goals rule was applied in the quarter-finals and semi-finals, but not the final.
In the quarter-finals and semi-finals, if the two teams were tied on aggregate and away goals, the higher seeded team advanced.
In the final, if the two teams were tied after both legs, the match went to extra time and, if necessary, a shoot-out.
Both finalists qualified to the 2020 CONCACAF Champions League.

Bracket

Quarter-finals

|}

All times are UTC−5

First leg

Second leg

Cruz Azul won 3–1 on aggregate.

Monterrey won 3–0 on aggregate.

UNAM won 4–3 on aggregate.

América won 5–4 on aggregate.

Semi-finals

|}

All times are UTC−5

First leg

Second leg

1–1 on aggregate and tied on away goals. Cruz Azul advanced for being the higher seed in the classification table.

América won 7–2 on aggregate.

Finals

|}

First leg

Details

Statistics

Second leg

América won 2–0 on aggregate.

Details

Statistics

Statistics

Goalscorers
3 goals
 Bruno Valdez (América)

2 goals
 Emanuel Aguilera (América)
 Edson Álvarez (América)
 Carlos González (UNAM)
 Rogelio Funes Mori (Monterrey)
 Diego Lainez (América)
 Roger Martínez (América)
 Felipe Mora (UNAM)

1 goal
 Pablo Aguilar (Cruz Azul)
 Paul Aguilar (América)
 Matías Alustiza (UNAM)
 Javier Aquino (UANL)
 Milton Caraglio (Cruz Azul)
 William (Toluca)
 Jesús Dueñas (UANL)
 Elías Hernández (Cruz Azul)
 Renato Ibarra (América)
 Édgar Méndez (Cruz Azul)
 Rodolfo Pizarro (Monterrey)
 Guido Rodríguez (América)
 Martín Rodríguez (UNAM)
 Luis Romo (Querétaro)
 Rubens Sambueza (Toluca)
 Nicolás Sánchez (Monterrey)
 Fernando Tobio (Toluca)
 Alexis Vega (Toluca)

Own goal
 Alfredo Saldívar (for UANL)

Assists
4 assists
 Mateus Uribe (América)

2 assists
 Adrián Aldrete (Cruz Azul)
 Renato Ibarra (América)
 Víctor Malcorra (UNAM)
 Oribe Peralta (América)
 Carlos Rodríguez (Monterrey)

1 assist
 Paul Aguilar (América)
 Javier Aquino (UANL)
 Pablo Barrera (UNAM)
 Cecilio Domínguez (América)
 Carlos González (UNAM)
 Avilés Hurtado (Monterrey)
 Édgar Méndez (Cruz Azul)
 Alan Mozo (UNAM)
 Dorlan Pabón (Monterrey)
 Guido Pizarro (UANL)
 Rubens Sambueza (Toluca)
 Jorge Sánchez (América)
 Enrique Triverio (Toluca)

Notes

References

 
1
Liga MX seasons